This is a list of state parks in the U.S. state of New York. Also listed are state golf courses, seasonal hunting areas, and former state parks.

In New York, state parks are managed by the Office of Parks, Recreation and Historic Preservation (OPRHP), with the exception of the Adirondack and Catskill Parks which are managed by the Department of Environmental Conservation (DEC). Outside of the Adirondacks and the Catskills, the state parks department is organized into eleven regions:
Niagara
Allegany
Genesee
Finger Lakes
Central
Taconic
Palisades
Long Island
Thousand Islands
Saratoga/Capital District
New York City

Forest preserve

Together they comprise the New York Forest Preserve, properties that must be kept "Forever Wild" according to Article 14 of the New York Constitution. Both parks are managed by DEC; the Adirondack Park is managed by the Adirondack Park Agency, as well.

State parks

OPRHP manages lands designated as state parks in New York, with the aims of providing public space for outdoor recreation while conserving natural and cultural resources. The agency offers the "Empire Passport", which provides unlimited day use vehicle entry to most of New York's state parks and recreational facilities. As of 2017, New York has 215 state parks and historic sites encompassing 350,000 acres. The agency's portfolio also includes 28 golf courses, 35 swimming pools, 67 beaches, and 18 museums and nature centers.

The following sortable tables list current and former New York state parks, respectively, all 'owned' or managed by the OPRHP, as of 2015. Some OPRHP-'owned' parks are managed primarily or in part by other agencies, through lease or partnership agreements. The second table lists three former New York state parks that have been transferred to other entities.

State parks
{|class="wikitable sortable" style="width:100%"

! style="width:*;" scope="col"| Park name
! style="width:*;" scope="col"| Region
! style="width:*;" scope="col"| County or counties
! style="width:*;" scope="col"| Area
! style="width:*;" scope="col" data-sort-type="number"| Year created
! style="width:*;" scope="col" data-sort-type="number"| Visitors (2014)
! style="width:*;" scope="col"| Water bodies
! style="width:*;" scope="col"| Notes
! style="width:*;" class="unsortable" scope="col"| Image

|-
! scope="row"| Allan H. Treman State Marine Park
|| Finger Lakes || Tompkins ||  ||  || 210,543 || Cayuga Lake || Includes a marina with 430 boat slips, fishing, birdwatching, and picnic tables. || 

|-
! scope="row"| Allegany State Park
|| Allegany || Cattaraugus  ||  || 1921 || 1,451,000 || Allegheny Reservoir, Red House Lake, Quaker Lake || Largest state park in New York. Includes two separate areas developed for recreation, the Red House Area and the Quaker Area, each with cabins and campsites. Both areas include formally designated bird conservation areas.|| 

|-
! scope="row"| Amherst State Park
|| Niagara || Erie ||  || 2000 ||  || Ellicott Creek || Located on the grounds of a former Catholic convent. Operated by the Town of Amherst. || 

|-
! scope="row"| Amsterdam Beach State Park
|| Long Island || Suffolk ||  || 2005 ||  || Atlantic Ocean || Undeveloped except for trails. Operated in conjunction with the Town of East Hampton and Suffolk County. || 

|-
! scope="row"| Battle Island State Park
|| Central || Oswego ||  || 1938 || 29,291 || Oswego River || Includes the 18-hole Battle Island State Park Golf Course. Named for a battle that took place nearby during the French and Indian War in 1756. || 

|-
! scope="row"| Bayard Cutting Arboretum State Park
|| Long Island || Suffolk ||  || 1936 || 225,456 || Connetquot River || Includes a large arboretum designed by Frederick Law Olmsted and the Westbrook mansion designed by Charles C. Haight. || 

|-
! scope="row"| Bayswater Point State Park
|| New York City || Queens ||  || 1991 || 17,566 || Jamaica Bay || Undeveloped. Previously home to a large mansion, now destroyed. Presently hosts passive recreation while preserving shorebird habitat. || 

|-
! scope="row"| Bear Mountain State Park
|| Palisades || Rockland ||  || 1913 || 1,894,373 || Hudson River || Managed in conjunction with the Palisades Interstate Park Commission. || 

|-
! scope="row"| Beaver Island State Park
|| Niagara || Erie ||  || 1935 || 276,888 || Niagara River || Located on Grand Island. Includes a USGA-recognized championship 18-hole public golf course. || 

|-
! scope="row"| Beechwood State Park
|| Finger Lakes || Wayne ||  || 1999 ||  || Lake Ontario || Undeveloped. Previously the site of a Girl Scout camp. Managed by the Town of Sodus since 2010. || 

|-
! scope="row"| Belmont Lake State Park
|| Long Island || Suffolk ||  || 1926 || 578,226 || Belmont Lake || Day-use only. Formerly hosted the headquarters of the Long Island State Park Commission. || 

|-
! scope="row"|  Bethpage State Park 
|| Long Island || Nassau, Suffolk ||  || 1934 || 795,563 ||  || Includes five golf courses, including the Bethpage Black Course, which hosted the 2002 and 2009 U.S. Open Golf Championships. || 

|-
! scope="row"|  Betty and Wilbur Davis State Park 
|| Central || Otsego ||  || 2001 || 12,271 ||  || Features full-service cabins and trails through meadows and forest. || 

|-
! scope="row"|  Big Six Mile Creek Marina 
|| Niagara || Erie ||  ||  || 75,132 || Niagara River || Functions as a marina with 134 seasonal boat slips and a boat launch ramp. || 

|-
! scope="row"|  Blauvelt State Park 
|| Palisades || Rockland ||  || 1913 || 24,529 ||  || Undeveloped. Former location of Camp Bluefields, a rifle range used to train members of the New York National Guard prior to World War I. Managed in conjunction with the Palisades Interstate Park Commission. || 

|-
! scope="row"|  Bonavista State Park Golf Course 
|| Finger Lakes || Seneca ||  ||  || 6,409 || Seneca Lake || Includes a nine-hole golf course. || 

|-
! scope="row"|  Bowman Lake State Park 
|| Central || Chenango ||  || 1966 || 51,589 || Bowman Lake || Features one of the largest campgrounds in central New York, containing 188 campsites for tents and trailers, as well as several rustic cabins. || 

|-
! scope="row"|  Braddock Bay State Park 
|| Genesee || Monroe ||  || 1956 ||  || Lake Ontario || Popular birdwatching location; park is adjacent to the  Braddock Bay Fish and Wildlife Management Area. Leased and maintained by the Town of Greece. || 

|-
! scope="row"|  Brentwood State Park 
|| Long Island || Suffolk ||  || 2003 || 205,020 ||  || An athletic field complex with eight soccer fields and two baseball fields on artificial turf. || 

|-
! scope="row"|  Bristol Beach State Park 
|| Palisades || Ulster ||  || 1967 || 10,613 || Hudson River || Undeveloped. Managed in conjunction with the Palisades Interstate Park Commission. || 

|-
! scope="row"|  Brookhaven State Park 
|| Long Island || Suffolk||  || 1971 ||  ||  || Protects a large area of the Long Island Pine Barrens and contains scattered wetlands. || 

|-
! scope="row"|  Buckhorn Island State Park 
|| Niagara || Erie ||  || 1935 || 31,905 || Niagara River || Managed as a preserve with space for passive recreational uses such as biking, hiking and fishing. Includes a bird conservation area. || 

|-
! scope="row"|  Buffalo Harbor State Park 
|| Niagara || Erie ||  || 2015 ||  || Lake Erie || Features a 1,000 slip marina and is part of an overall initiative to revitalize Buffalo's outer harbor. || 

|-
! scope="row"|  Burnham Point State Park 
|| Thousand Islands || Jefferson ||  || 1898 || 12,249 || St. Lawrence River || Primarily offers space to camp, including 47 tent and trailer sites, 19 of which contain electrical hookups. || 

|-
! scope="row"|  Buttermilk Falls State Park 
|| Finger Lakes || Tompkins ||  || 1924 || 197,981 || Buttermilk Creek || Features several waterfalls and wooded gorges. || 

|-
! scope="row"|  Caleb Smith State Park Preserve 
|| Long Island || Suffolk ||  || 1963 || 27,863 || Nissequogue River || Managed as a nature preserve. Includes the Wyandanch Club Historic District. || 

|-
! scope="row"|  Camp Hero State Park 
|| Long Island || Suffolk ||  || 2002 || 114,995 || Atlantic Ocean ||  Occupies a portion of the former Montauk Air Force Station. || 

|-
! scope="row"|  Canandaigua Lake State Marine Park 
|| Finger Lakes || Ontario ||  ||  || 43,746 || Canandaigua Lake || Offers boat launch facilities to allow access to Canandaigua Lake. || 

|-
! scope="row"|  Canoe-Picnic Point State Park 
|| Thousand Islands || Jefferson ||  || 1897 || 7,221 || St. Lawrence River || Accessible only by boat. Offers a campground with tent sites. || 

|-
! scope="row"|  Captree State Park 
|| Long Island || Suffolk ||  || 1954 || 1,124,776 || Great South Bay, Fire Island Inlet || Home to "The Captree Fleet", Long Island's largest public fleet of charter boats, available for fishing, scuba diving, sightseeing and excursion tours. || 

|-
! scope="row"|  Catharine Valley Trail 
|| Finger Lakes || Schuyler, Chemung ||  || 2000 ||  ||  || Encompasses a planned  recreation trail that follows abandoned railroad grades and canal towpaths between Watkins Glen and Horseheads. || 

|-
! scope="row"|  Caumsett State Historic Park Preserve 
|| Long Island || Suffolk ||  || 1961 || 460,254 || Long Island Sound || Includes the former estate house of Marshall Field III, built in 1925 and among the largest of Long Island's Gold Coast Mansions; also includes a bird conservation area. || 

|-
! scope="row"|  Cayuga Lake State Park 
|| Finger Lakes || Seneca ||  || 1927 || 129,415 || Cayuga Lake || Offers amenities including a beach, boat launch, and a campground. || 

|-
! scope="row"|  Cedar Island State Park 
|| Thousand Islands || St. Lawrence ||  || 1898 || 1,928 || St. Lawrence River || Accessible only by boat. Offers dockage, a day-use area and a small campground. || 

|-
! scope="row"|  Cedar Point State Park 
|| Thousand Islands || Jefferson ||  || 1898 || 72,601 || St. Lawrence River || Includes a campground, beach, and boat launch. || 

|-
! scope="row"|  Chenango Valley State Park 
|| Central || Broome ||  ||  || 173,960 || Chenango River, Chenango Lake, Lily Lake || Offers a beach, campground, cabins, and 18-hole golf course. || 

|-
! scope="row"|  Cherry Plain State Park 
|| Saratoga/Capital District || Rensselaer ||  || 1962 || 23,250 || Black River, West Brook || Offers a beach, fishing, and camping at 30 sites. Located adjacent to the  Capital District Wildlife Management Area, which offers additional hiking and recreation. || 

|-
! scope="row"|  Chimney Bluffs State Park 
|| Finger Lakes || Wayne ||  || 1963 || 117,811 || Lake Ontario || Features dramatically carved  shoreside cliffs formed from eroded drumlins. Lightly developed for day-use only. || 

|-
! scope="row"|  Chittenango Falls State Park 
|| Central || Madison ||  || 1922 || 46,988 || Chittenango Creek || Day-use only. Features a  waterfall. Also home to the endemic and endangered Chittenango ovate amber snail. || 

|-
! scope="row"|  Clarence Fahnestock State Park 
|| Taconic || Putnam, Dutchess ||  || 1929 || 285,464 || Canopus Lake || Includes the Taconic Outdoor Education Center. Offers a beach, fishing, and camping. Dedicated winter recreation facilities available seasonally. || 

|-
! scope="row"|  Clark Reservation State Park 
|| Central || Onondaga ||  || 1926 || 68,371 || Glacier Lake || Centered around the former plunge pool of a large ice age-era waterfall. Harbors the largest U.S. population of the endangered American hart's tongue fern. || 

|-
! scope="row"|  Clay Pit Ponds State Park Preserve 
|| New York City || Richmond ||  || 1977 || 25,343 ||  || Managed as a nature preserve to protect wetlands, ponds, sand barrens, spring-fed streams, and forest on Staten Island. Includes a bird conservation area. || 

|-
! scope="row"|  Cold Spring Harbor State Park 
|| Long Island || Suffolk ||  || 2000 || 165,484 ||  || Day-use only. Comprises steep wooded slopes and intended to retain a natural character. Allows passive recreation such as hiking, snowshoeing, and cross-country skiing. Linked to Bethpage State Park by the linear Trail View State Park. || 

|-
! scope="row"|  Coles Creek State Park 
|| Thousand Islands || St. Lawrence ||  ||  || 175,087 || St. Lawrence River || Offers a beach, marina, and a campground with 232 tent and trailer sites. || 

|-
! scope="row"|  Conesus Lake Boat Launch 
|| Genesee || Livingston ||  ||  || 27,025 || Conesus Lake || Offers a boat launch, fishing access, and picnic tables. || 

|-
! scope="row"|  Connetquot River State Park Preserve 
|| Long Island || Suffolk ||  || 1973 || 233,504 || Connetquot River || Home to the Long Island Environmental Interpretive Center. Managed to preserve wildlife habitat; allows for passive recreation such as hiking and fishing. || 

|-
! scope="row"|  Crab Island State Park 
|| Thousand Islands || Clinton ||  || 1988 ||  || Lake Champlain || Undeveloped. Obtained by New York State to prevent development of an historic site and cemetery associated with the War of 1812. || 

|-
! scope="row"|  Croil Island State Park 
|| Thousand Islands || St. Lawrence ||  ||  ||  || St. Lawrence River || Undeveloped. Maintained by the NYS Office of Parks, Recreation and Historic Preservation and owned by the New York Power Authority. || 

|-
! scope="row"|  Cumberland Bay State Park 
|| Thousand Islands || Clinton ||  || 1932 || 47,432 || Lake Champlain || Offers a  sand beach, playing fields, and a campground. || 

|-
! scope="row"|  Darien Lakes State Park 
|| Genesee || Genesee ||  || 1965 || 68,360 || Harlow Lake || Functions primarily as a campground, with additional features including a beach, fishing, and hiking trails. || 

|-
! scope="row"|  De Veaux Woods State Park 
|| Niagara || Niagara ||  || 2001 || 90,202 ||  || Originally part of the campus for DeVeaux College for Orphans and Destitute Children, which closed in 1972. Includes recreational facilities and a parcel of old growth forest. || 

|-
! scope="row"|  Deans Cove Boat Launch 
|| Finger Lakes || Seneca ||  ||  || 14,448 || Cayuga Lake ||  || 

|-
! scope="row"|  Delta Lake State Park 
|| Central || Oneida ||  (formerly ) || 1962 || 209,556 || Delta Reservoir || Offers a beach, boat launch, campground, and hiking. || 

|-
! scope="row"|  Devil's Hole State Park 
|| Niagara || Niagara ||  || 1924 || 136,118 || Niagara River || Overlooks the Niagara River gorge. || 

|-
! scope="row"|  Dewolf Point State Park 
|| Thousand Islands || Jefferson ||  || 1898 || 15,893 || St. Lawrence River || Located on Wellesley Island. Offers a boat launch, dock, and campsites. || 

|-
! scope="row"|  Donald J. Trump State Park 
|| Taconic || Westchester, Putnam ||  || 2006 ||  ||  || Undeveloped. Land donated by and named for Donald Trump after development plans failed. Development and maintenance ceased in 2010. || 

|-
! scope="row"|  Earl W. Brydges Artpark State Park 
|| Niagara || Niagara ||  || 1974 || 301,523 ||  || Serves as an exhibition space for outdoor sculpture, as well as a concert venue. || 

|-
! scope="row"|  East River State Park 
|| New York City || Kings ||  || 2007 || 1,464,993 || East River || Day use only. Offers open space and views of the Manhattan skyline. || 

|-
! scope="row"|  Eel Weir State Park 
|| Thousand Islands || St. Lawrence ||  ||  || 3,377 || Oswegatchie River || Offers a small campground, fishing, and trails. || 

|-
! scope="row"|  Evangola State Park 
|| Niagara || Erie ||  || 1954 || 139,804 ||Lake Erie
| Offers a campground, playing fields, and trails. || 

|-
! scope="row"|  Fair Haven Beach State Park 
|| Finger Lakes || Cayuga ||  || 1928 || 295,527 || Lake Ontario || Includes the Springbrook Greens State Golf Course || 

|-
! scope="row"|  Fillmore Glen State Park 
|| Finger Lakes || Cayuga ||  || 1925 || 83,044 ||  || Known for its several waterfalls. Also offers camping. || 

|-
! scope="row"|  Fort Niagara State Park 
|| Niagara || Niagara ||  || 1948 || 599,586 || Niagara River, Lake Ontario || Historic Fort Niagara is located within the park. || 

|-
! scope="row"|  Four Mile Creek State Park 
|| Niagara || Niagara ||  || 1961 || 79,609 || Lake Ontario ||  || 

|-
! scope="row"|  Franklin D. Roosevelt State Park 
|| Taconic || Westchester ||  || 1957 || 490,546 || Crom Pond, Mohansic Lake || Day use only. Includes a large pool and two lakes. || 

|-
! scope="row"| Franklin D. Roosevelt Four Freedoms Park
|| New York City || New York ||  || 2012 ||  || East River ||  || 

|-
! scope="row"|  Franny Reese State Park 
|| Palisades || Ulster ||  || 2009 ||  || Hudson River || Day use only. Managed by Scenic Hudson. || 

|-
! scope="row"|  Galop Island State Park 
|| Thousand Islands || St. Lawrence ||  ||  ||  || St. Lawrence River || Undeveloped. || 

|-
! scope="row"|  Gantry Plaza State Park 
|| New York City || Queens ||  || 1998 || 905,450 || East River, Anable Basin || Recently developed day-use park highlighting structures from Long Island City's industrial past. || 

|-
! scope="row"|  Genesee Valley Greenway 
|| Genesee || Monroe, Livingston, Wyoming, Allegany  ||  || 1984 || 39,087 || Genesee River || A  trail following the routes of former canals and railways between Rochester and Cuba, with a planned extension to Hinsdale. || 

|-
! scope="row"|  Gilbert Lake State Park 
|| Central || Otsego ||  || 1926 || 77,959 || Gilbert Lake ||  || 

|-
! scope="row"|  Gilgo State Park 
|| Long Island || Suffolk ||  || 1928 ||  ||  Atlantic Ocean, Great South Bay || Undeveloped. || 

|-
! scope="row"|  Glimmerglass State Park 
|| Central || Otsego ||  || 1963 || 153,882 || Otsego Lake ||  || 

|-
! scope="row"|  Golden Hill State Park 
|| Niagara || Niagara ||  || 1962 || 70,734 || Lake Ontario ||  || 

|-
! scope="row"|  Goosepond Mountain State Park 
|| Palisades || Orange ||  || 1960 || 2,967 || Seely Brook || Undeveloped. Managed by the Palisades Interstate Park Commission. || 

|-
! scope="row"|  Grafton Lakes State Park 
|| Saratoga/Capital District || Rensselaer ||  || 1971 || 240,063 || Long Pond, Second Pond, Shaver Pond, Mill Pond, Martin-Durham Reservoir || Includes a bird conservation area. || 

|-
! scope="row"|  Grass Point State Park 
|| Thousand Islands || Jefferson ||  || 1926 || 38,109 || St. Lawrence River ||  || 

|-
! scope="row"|  Green Lakes State Park 
|| Central || Onondaga ||  || 1928 || 1,079,160 || Green Lake, Round Lake || Includes the Green Lakes State Park Golf Course and a bird conservation area. || 

|-
! scope="row"| Hallock State Park Preserve
|| Long Island || Suffolk ||  || 2006 ||  || Long Island Sound || Undeveloped. || 

|-
! scope="row"|  Hamlin Beach State Park 
|| Genesee || Monroe ||  || 1938 || 278,098 || Lake Ontario ||  || 

|-
! scope="row"|  Harriet Hollister Spencer State Recreation Area 
|| Finger Lakes || Ontario ||  || 1962 || 61,392 ||  ||  ||

|-
! scope="row"|  Harriman State Park 
|| Palisades || Orange, Rockland ||  || 1910 || 1,425,000 || Lake Sebago, Lake Tiorati, Lake Kanawauke, Pine Meadow Lake ||  || 

|-
! scope="row"| Hart's Brook Nature Preserve
|| Taconic || Westchester ||  || 1999 ||  ||  || Wildlife preserve with trails, administered jointly with Westchester County, and the Town of Greenburgh || 

|-
! scope="row"|  Haverstraw Beach State Park 
|| Palisades || Rockland ||  || 1911 || 30,152 || Hudson River ||  || 

|-
! scope="row"|  Heckscher State Park 
|| Long Island || Suffolk ||  || 1929 || 982,530 || Great South Bay ||  || 

|-
! scope="row"| Helen L. McNitt State Park
|| Central || Madison ||  || 1999 ||  || Cazenovia Lake || Undeveloped. || 

|-
! scope="row"|  Hempstead Lake State Park 
|| Long Island || Nassau ||  || 1928 || 323,863 || Hempstead Lake ||  || 

|-
! scope="row"|  High Tor State Park 
|| Palisades || Rockland ||  || 1943 || 21,524 ||  ||  || 

|-
! scope="row"|  Highland Lakes State Park 
|| Palisades || Orange ||  || 1964  || 4,451 ||  || Undeveloped. Managed in conjunction with the Palisades Interstate Park Commission. || 

|-
! scope="row"|  Higley Flow State Park 
|| Thousand Islands || St. Lawrence ||  || 1936 || 46,564 || Raquette River ||  || 

|-
! scope="row"|  Hither Hills State Park 
|| Long Island || Suffolk ||  || 1924 || 425,642 || Atlantic Ocean || Includes a bird conservation area. || 

|-
! scope="row"|  Honeoye Lake Boat Launch State Park 
|| Finger Lakes || Ontario||  ||  || 35,610 || Honeoye Lake ||  || 

|-
! scope="row"|  Hook Mountain State Park 
|| Palisades || Rockland ||  || 1911 || 36,806 ||  || Undeveloped. || 

|-
! scope="row"|  Hudson Highlands State Park 
|| Taconic || Dutchess, Putnam, Westchester ||  || 1970 || 224,015 || Hudson River || Includes a bird conservation area. || 

|-
! scope="row"|  Hudson River Islands State Park 
|| Saratoga/Capital District || Columbia, Greene ||  ||  ||  || Hudson River ||  || 

|-
! scope="row"|  Hudson River Park 
|| New York City || New York ||  || 1998 ||  || North River ||  || 

|-
! scope="row"|  Iona Island State Park 
|| Palisades || Rockland ||  || 1965 ||  || Hudson River || Undeveloped. || 

|-
! scope="row"|  Irondequoit Bay State Marine Park 
|| Genesee || Monroe ||  || 1970|| 41,812 || Irondequoit Bay ||  || 

|-
! scope="row"|  Jacques Cartier State Park 
|| Thousand Islands || St. Lawrence ||  ||  || 22,022 || St. Lawrence River ||  || 

|-
! scope="row"|  James Baird State Park 
|| Taconic || Dutchess ||  || 1939 || 103,618 ||  || Day use only. Offers trails, an 18-hole golf course, and a sports complex that includes facilities for softball, volleyball, basketball, and tennis. || 

|-
! scope="row"|  Jay Estate 
|| Taconic || Westchester ||  || 1992 || 12,500 ||Long Island Sound
| Joint ownwership with Westchester County and the non-profit Jay Heritage Center. Operated and maintained by the Jay Heritage Center. Centerpiece of the National Historic Landmark Boston Post Road Historic District. Historic tours and conservation programs. || 

|-
! scope="row"|  John Boyd Thacher State Park 
|| Saratoga/Capital District|| Albany ||  || 1914 || 391,456 ||  ||  || 

|-
! scope="row"|  Jones Beach State Park 
|| Long Island || Nassau ||  || 1929 || 5,442,032 || Atlantic Ocean, Zach's Bay || Includes the Jones Beach State Park Pitch and Putt Course || 

|-
! scope="row"|  Joseph Davis State Park 
|| Niagara || Niagara ||  || 1964 || 27,644 || Niagara River || Includes a bird conservation area. || 

|-
! scope="row"|  Keewaydin State Park 
|| Thousand Islands || Jefferson ||  || 1962 || 55,749 || St. Lawrence River ||  || 

|-
! scope="row"|  Keuka Lake State Park 
|| Finger Lakes || Yates ||  || 1961 || 102,883 || Keuka Lake ||  || 

|-
! scope="row"|  Knox Farm State Park 
|| Niagara || Erie ||  || 2001 ||  || Cazenovia Creek ||  || 

|-
! scope="row"|  Kring Point State Park 
|| Thousand Islands || Jefferson ||  || 1898 || 54,550 || St. Lawrence River ||  || 

|-
! scope="row"|  Lake Erie State Park 
|| Allegany || Chautauqua ||  || 1928|| 97,565 || Lake Erie ||  || 

|-
! scope="row"| Lake Lauderdale State Park
|| Saratoga/Capital District || Washington ||  || 1968 ||  || Lake Lauderdale || Managed by Washington County since the late 1980s as a county park under a long-term lease agreement with the state. || 

|-
! scope="row"|  Lake Superior State Park 
|| Palisades || Sullivan ||  || 1967 || 11,135 || Lake Superior ||  || 

|-
! scope="row"|  Lake Taghkanic State Park 
|| Taconic || Columbia ||  || 1929 || 259,146 || Lake Taghkanic ||  || 

|-
! scope="row"|  Lakeside Beach State Park 
|| Genesee || Orleans ||  || 1962 || 77,326 || Lake Ontario ||  || 

|-
! scope="row"|  Letchworth State Park 
|| Genesee || Livingston, Wyoming ||  || 1906 || 644,441 || Genesee River || Includes a bird conservation area. || 

|-
! scope="row"|  Lock 32 State Canal Park 
|| Genesee || Monroe ||  || 1978 ||  || Erie Canal ||  || 

|-
! scope="row"|  Lodi Point State Park 
|| Finger Lakes || Seneca ||  || 1963 || 32,693 || Seneca Lake ||  || 

|-
! scope="row"|  Long Point State Park - Finger Lakes 
|| Finger Lakes || Cayuga ||  || 1963 || 32,798 || Cayuga Lake ||  || 

|-
! scope="row"|  Long Point State Park - Thousand Islands 
|| Thousand Islands || Jefferson ||  || 1913 || 35,450 || Lake Ontario ||  || 

|-
! scope="row"|  Long Point State Park on Lake Chautauqua 
|| Allegany || Chautauqua ||  || 1956 || 62,034 || Chautauqua Lake ||  || 

|-
! scope="row"|  Macomb Reservation State Park 
|| Thousand Islands || Clinton ||  || 1968 || 29,862 || Salmon River ||  || 

|-
! scope="row"|  Margaret Lewis Norrie State Park
|| Taconic || Dutchess ||  || 1934 || 203,730 || Hudson River || Includes a bird conservation area. || 

|-
! scope="row"|  Mark Twain State Park and Soaring Eagles Golf Course 
|| Finger Lakes || Chemung ||  ||  || 26,930 ||  || Includes the Soaring Eagles Golf Course || 

|-
! scope="row"|  Mary Island State Park 
|| Thousand Islands || Jefferson ||  || 1897 || 3,415 || St. Lawrence River ||  || 

|-
! scope="row"|  Max V. Shaul State Park 
|| Saratoga/Capital District || Schoharie ||  || 1959 || 25,885 || Panther Creek, Schoharie Creek ||  || 

|-
! scope="row"|  Mexico Point State Park 
|| Central || Oswego ||  ||  ||  || Lake Ontario, Little Salmon River || Operated and developed since 1992 by the Town of Mexico. || 

|-
! scope="row"|  Mexico Point Boat Launch 
|| Central || Oswego ||  ||  || 15,239 || Lake Ontario, Little Salmon River ||  || 

|-
! scope="row"|  Midway State Park 
|| Allegany || Chautauqua ||  || 2007 || 89,838 ||  Chautauqua Lake  ||  || 

|-
! scope="row"|  Mine Kill State Park 
|| Saratoga/Capital District || Schoharie ||  || 1973 || 84,343 || Blenheim-Gilboa Reservoir, Schoharie Creek ||  || 
|-
! scope="row"|  Miner Lake State Park 
|| North Country || Clinton ||  ||  || ||Miner Lake||Not a functioning park. Land is managed by the Ganienkeh Mohawk community since 1977.<ref name="nytimes.com">SAM HOWE VERHOVEK, "Standoff Ends, but Not Mohawk Defiance", The New York Times", 14 Apr 1990, 27 Feb 2010</ref> ||
|-
! scope="row"|  Minnewaska State Park Preserve 
|| Palisades || Ulster ||  || 1987|| 290,659 || Lake Minnewaska, Lake Awosting, Mud Pond || Includes a bird conservation area. || 

|-
! scope="row"|  Mohawk River State Park 
|| Saratoga/Capital District || Schenectady ||  || 2006 ||  || Mohawk River || Undeveloped except for hiking trails. Formerly known as the Schenectady Museum Nature Preserve. || 

|-
! scope="row"|  Montauk Downs State Park 
|| Long Island || Suffolk ||  || 1978 || 120,860 ||  || Includes the Montauk Downs State Park Golf Course || 

|-
! scope="row"|  Montauk Point State Park 
|| Long Island || Suffolk ||  || 1924|| 816,970 || Atlantic Ocean, Lake Munchogue (Oyster Pond), Block Island Sound ||  || 

|-
! scope="row"|  Moreau Lake State Park 
|| Saratoga/Capital District || Saratoga ||  || 1967 || 326,564 || Moreau Lake || Includes a bird conservation area. || 

|-
! scope="row"|  Napeague State Park 
|| Long Island || Suffolk ||  || 1978 || 65,985 || Atlantic Ocean, Gardiners Bay, Block Island Sound || Undeveloped. || 

|-
! scope="row"|  Newtown Battlefield State Park 
|| Finger Lakes || Chemung ||  ||  || 34,455 ||  ||  || 

|-
! scope="row"|  Niagara Falls State Park 
|| Niagara || Niagara ||  || 1885 || 9,011,709 || Niagara River ||  || 

|-
! scope="row"|  Nissequogue River State Park 
|| Long Island || Suffolk ||  || 2000 || 95,288 || Nissequogue River || Includes a bird conservation area. || 

|-
! scope="row"|  Nyack Beach State Park 
|| Palisades || Rockland ||  || 1911 || 169,661 || Hudson River ||  || 

|-
! scope="row"|  Oak Orchard State Marine Park 
|| Genesee || Orleans ||  ||  || 9,259 || Lake Ontario, Oak Orchard Creek ||  || 

|-
! scope="row"|  Ogden Mills & Ruth Livingston Mills State Park 
|| Taconic || Dutchess ||  ||  || 203,730 || Hudson River || Includes the Dinsmore Golf Course and a bird conservation area. || 

|-
! scope="row"|  Old Croton Aqueduct State Historic Park 
|| Taconic || Westchester ||  || 1968 || 1,009,221 ||  ||  || 

|-
! scope="row"|  Old Erie Canal State Historic Park 
|| Central || Madison, Oneida, Onondaga  ||  ||  || 86,289 || Erie Canal ||  || 

|-
! scope="row"|  Oquaga Creek State Park 
|| Central || Broome, Delaware, Chenango ||  ||  || 53,495 || Arctic Lake ||  || 

|-
! scope="row"|  Orient Beach State Park 
|| Long Island || Suffolk ||  || 1929 || 452,199 || Gardiners Bay, Orient Harbor, Long Beach Bay ||  || 

|-
! scope="row"|  Peebles Island State Park 
|| Saratoga/Capital District || Saratoga, Albany ||  || 1973 || 115,344 || Mohawk River, Hudson River ||  || 

|-
! scope="row"|  Pinnacle State Park and Golf Course 
|| Finger Lakes || Steuben ||  ||  || 6,055 ||  || Includes the Pinnacle State Park Golf Course || 

|-
! scope="row"|  Pixley Falls State Park 
|| Central || Oneida ||  || 1924 || 27,981 || Lansing Kill ||  || 

|-
! scope="row"|  Point Au Roche State Park 
|| Thousand Islands || Clinton ||  || 1975 || 74,730 || Lake Champlain ||  || 

|-
! scope="row"|  Reservoir State Park 
|| Niagara || Niagara ||  || 1962 || 148,768 || Lewiston Reservoir ||  || 

|-
! scope="row"|  Riverbank State Park 
|| New York City || New York ||  || 1993 || 3,187,269 || Hudson River ||  || 

|-
! scope="row"|  Robert Moses State Park (Long Island) 
|| Long Island || Suffolk ||  || 1908 || 3,477,086 || Atlantic Ocean, Fire Island Inlet || Includes the Robert Moses State Park Pitch and Putt Course  || 

|-
! scope="row"|  Robert Moses State Park (Thousand Islands) 
|| Thousand Islands || St. Lawrence ||  || 1958 || 98,257 || St. Lawrence River ||  || 

|-
! scope="row"|  Robert V. Riddell State Park 
|| Central || Otsego ||  || 2005 ||  || Schenevus Creek, Mud Lake || Allows for passive recreation including hiking, snowshoeing, cross-country skiing, and fishing. || 

|-
! scope="row"|  Robert H. Treman State Park 
|| Finger Lakes || Tompkins ||  || 1920 || 210,543 || Enfield Creek ||  || 

|-
! scope="row"|  Robert G. Wehle State Park 
|| Thousand Islands || Jefferson ||  || 2004 || 75,842 || Lake Ontario ||  || 

|-
! scope="row"|  Roberto Clemente State Park 
|| New York City || Bronx ||  || 1973 || 1,092,606 || Harlem River || The first New York state park established in an urban setting. Originally named Harlem River State Park. Includes swimming pools, sports fields, and picnic areas. || 

|-
! scope="row"|  Rock Island Lighthouse State Park 
|| Thousand Islands || Jefferson ||  || 1976 || 6,941 || St. Lawrence River || Accessible only by boat. Visitors may tour the Rock Island Light and a museum maintained in the former keeper's quarters. || 

|-
! scope="row"|  Rockefeller State Park Preserve 
|| Taconic || Westchester ||  || 1983 || 337,842 || Pocantico River || "A National Audubon Society Important Bird Area" || 

|-
! scope="row"|  Rockland Lake State Park 
|| Palisades || Rockland ||  || 1958 || 629,173 || Rockland Lake || Includes the Rockland Lake State Park Golf Course and a bird conservation area.Rockland Lake State Park Golf Course || 

|-
! scope="row"|  St. Lawrence State Park Golf Course 
|| Thousand Islands || St. Lawrence ||  ||  || 9,386 || St. Lawrence River || Includes golf course || 

|-
! scope="row"|  Sampson State Park 
|| Finger Lakes || Seneca ||  || 1960 || 166,043 || Seneca Lake ||  || 

|-
! scope="row"|  Sandy Island Beach State Park 
|| Central || Oswego ||  || 2006 || 33,276 || Lake Ontario, North Sandy Pond ||  || 

|-
! scope="row"|  Saratoga Lake State Boat Launch 
|| Saratoga/Capital District || Saratoga ||  ||  || 125,144 || Saratoga Lake ||  || 

|-
! scope="row"|  Saratoga Spa State Park 
|| Saratoga/Capital District || Saratoga ||  || 1909 || 3,014,277 || Geyser Creek || Includes the Saratoga Spa State Park Golf Course and a bird conservation area.Saratoga Spa State Park Golf Course || 

|-
! scope="row"|  Schodack Island State Park 
|| Saratoga/Capital District || Rensselaer, Greene, Columbia ||  || 2002 || 125,466 || Hudson River || Includes a bird conservation area. || 

|-
! scope="row"|  Schunnemunk State Park 
|| Palisades || Orange ||  || 2003 || 44,141 ||  || Undeveloped except for hiking trails. || 

|-
! scope="row"|  Selkirk Shores State Park 
|| Central || Oswego ||  ||  || 77,930 || Lake Ontario || Includes a bird conservation area. || 

|-
! scope="row"|  Seneca Lake State Park 
|| Finger Lakes || Seneca ||  || 1957 || 144,200 || Seneca Lake ||  || 

|-
! scope="row"|  Shadmoor State Park 
|| Long Island || Suffolk ||  || 2000 || 44,235 || Atlantic Ocean ||  || 

|-
! scope="row"|  Shirley Chisholm State Park 
|| New York City || Kings ||  || 2019 || || Jamaica Bay, Hendrix Creek || Under construction, ribbon was cut on July 2, 2019 || 

|-
! scope="row"|  Silver Lake State Park 
|| Genesee || Wyoming ||  ||  || 22,478 || Silver Lake ||  || 
|-

! scope="row"|  Sojourner Truth State Park 
|| Palisades || Ulster ||  || 2022 || || Hudson River || Dedicated on February 28, 2022 || 

|-
! scope="row"|  Sonnenberg Gardens & Mansion State Historic Park 
|| Finger Lakes || Ontario ||  || 2005 ||  ||  ||  || 

|-
! scope="row"|  Southwick Beach State Park 
|| Thousand Islands || Jefferson ||  || 1966 || 114,990 || Lake Ontario ||  || 

|-
! scope="row"|  State Park at the Fair 
|| Central || Onondaga ||  || 1974 ||  ||  || Open during the Great New York State Fair, this state park is billed as New York's smallest. It simulates a park-like setting within the fairgrounds and includes exhibits focused on New York's state parks and historic sites. || 

|-
! scope="row"|  Sterling Forest State Park 
|| Palisades || Orange ||  || 1998 || 266,944 || Sterling Lake, Greenwood Lake || Includes a bird conservation area. || 

|-
! scope="row"|  Stony Brook State Park 
|| Finger Lakes || Steuben ||  || 1928 || 164,536 || Stony Brook ||  || 

|-
! scope="row"|  Storm King State Park 
|| Palisades || Orange ||  || 1922 || 6,944 || Hudson River || Undeveloped except for hiking trails and limited parking. Includes the summit of Storm King Mountain. || 

|-
! scope="row"| Strawberry Island State Park
|| Niagara || Erie ||  || 1989 ||  || Niagara River || Undeveloped. Managed as a fish and wildlife preserve. || 

|-
! scope="row"|  Sunken Meadow State Park 
|| Long Island || Suffolk ||  || 1926 || 2,042,449 || Long Island Sound || Also known as Governor Alfred E. Smith State Park. Includes the Sunken Meadow State Park Golf Course  || 

|-
! scope="row"|  Taconic State Park – Copake Falls area 
|| Taconic || Columbia ||  ||  || 272,484 ||  ||  || 

|-
! scope="row"|  Taconic State Park – Rudd Pond area 
|| Taconic || Dutchess ||  ||  || 18,890 || Rudd Pond ||  || 

|-
! scope="row"|  Tallman Mountain State Park 
|| Palisades || Rockland ||  || 1928 || 293,615 || Hudson River ||  || 

|-
! scope="row"|  Taughannock Falls State Park 
|| Finger Lakes || Tompkins ||  || 1925 || 434,090 || Cayuga Lake, Taughannock Creek ||  || 

|-
! scope="row"|  Thompson's Lake State Park 
|| Saratoga/Capital District || Albany ||  || 1961 || 63,934 || Thompson's Lake ||  || 

|-
! scope="row"|  Trail View State Park 
|| Long Island || Nassau, Suffolk ||  || 2002 || 138,005 ||  ||  || 

|-
! scope="row"| Two Rivers State Park Recreation Area
|| Finger Lakes || Tioga ||  || 2005 ||  || Dry Brook || Undeveloped except for hiking trails. || 

|-
! scope="row"|  Valley Stream State Park 
|| Long Island || Nassau ||  || 1928 || 267,789 || Valley Stream ||  || 

|-
! scope="row"|  Verona Beach State Park 
|| Central || Oneida ||  || 1944 || 206,438 || Oneida Lake ||  || 

|-
! scope="row"|  Walkway Over the Hudson State Historic Park 
|| Taconic || Dutchess, Ulster ||  || 2009 || 425,052 || Hudson River ||  || 

|-
! scope="row"|  Waterson Point State Park 
|| Thousand Islands || Jefferson ||  || 1898 || 1,600 || St. Lawrence River ||  || 

|-
! scope="row"|  Watkins Glen State Park 
|| Finger Lakes || Schuyler ||  || 1906 || 715,206 || Glen Creek ||  || 

|-
! scope="row"|  Wellesley Island State Park 
|| Thousand Islands || Jefferson ||  || 1951 || 204,017 || St. Lawrence River || Includes the Wellesley Island State Park Golf Course  || 

|-
! scope="row"|  Westcott Beach State Park 
|| Thousand Islands || Jefferson ||  || 1946 || 127,115 || Lake Ontario ||  || 

|-
! scope="row"|  Whetstone Gulf State Park 
|| Thousand Islands || Lewis ||  || 1929 || 118,577 || Whetstone Reservoir ||  || 

|-
! scope="row"|  Whirlpool State Park 
|| Niagara || Niagara ||  || 1928 || 306,841 || Niagara River ||  || 

|-
! scope="row"|  Wildwood State Park 
|| Long Island || Suffolk ||  || 1925 || 298,990 || Long Island Sound ||  || 

|-
! scope="row"|  Wilson-Tuscarora State Park 
|| Niagara || Niagara ||  || 1965 || 193,568 || Lake Ontario ||  || 

|-
! scope="row"|  Wonder Lake State Park 
|| Taconic || Putnam ||  || 1998 ||  || Wonder Lake, Laurel Pond ||  || 

|-
! scope="row"|  Woodlawn Beach State Park 
|| Niagara || Erie ||  || 1996 || 146,000 || Lake Erie || Operated since 2011 by the Town of Hamburg through a ten-year partnership agreement with New York State. || 

|}

 Former parks 

 State golf courses 

The NYS OPRHP maintains two state golf courses'' in addition to the courses noted above:

 Indian Hills State Golf Course (Finger Lakes Region), an 18-hole course in Painted Post, New York
 Sag Harbor State Golf Course (Long Island Region), a nine-hole facility within the Barcelona Neck Natural Resources Management Area, East Hampton, New York

Seasonal hunting 

New York state parks and historic sites where some type of hunting is permitted on a seasonal basis are listed below. A state license appropriate for that type of hunting is required; some sites also require park permits to hunt.

 Allegany
 Bonavista (limited to bow hunting)
 Bowman Lake
 Buttermilk Falls (limited to bow hunting)
 Cherry Plain
 Chimney Bluff
 Clarence Fahnestock (limited to bow hunting)
 Clermont (limited to bow hunting)
 Coles Creek (limited to bow hunting and muzzle loader)
 Connecticut Hills (limited to bow hunting)
 Darien Lakes
 Fillmore Glen (limited to bow hunting and muzzle loader)
 Ganondagon (limited to bow hunting)
 Gilbert Lake (limited to bow hunting)
 Grafton Lakes
 Harriet Hollister Spencer
 Higley Flow (limited to bow hunting and muzzle loader)
 Hither Hills
 Hudson Highlands
 Hudson River Islands
 Hunts Point
 Jacques Cartier (limited to bow hunting and muzzle loader)
 John Boyd Thacher
 Keuka Lake (limited to bow hunting and muzzle loader)
 Lake Superior
 Lake Taghkanic (limited to bow hunting)
 Letchworth
 Long Point (Cayuga County)
 Mark Twain (limited to bow hunting)
 Mine Kill
 Minnewaska
 Montauk Point
 Moreau Lake
 Napeague (limited to bow hunting)
 Newton Battlefield (limited to bow hunting)
 Oquaga Creek
 Pinnacle (limited to bow hunting and muzzle loader)
 Pixley Falls
 Sampson
 Schodack Island
 Silver Lake
 Sterling Forest
 Stony Brook (limited to bow hunting)
 Storm King
 Taconic (Rudd Pond and Copake Falls)
 Taughannock Falls (limited to bow hunting)
 Robert H. Treman (limited to bow hunting)
 Verona Beach (limited to bow hunting)
 Watkins Glen (limited to bow hunting)
 Wellesley Island (limited to bow hunting and muzzle loader)
 Whetstone Gulf (limited to bow hunting and muzzle loader )

See also
 Adirondack Park Agency
 Geography of New York
 List of New York City parks
 List of trails on Long Island
 New York City Department of Parks and Recreation
 New York State Canalway Trail
 New York State Department of Environmental Conservation
 Palisades Interstate Park Commission

References

External links

 New York State Office of Parks, Recreation and Historic Preservation
 State Parks
 Golf Courses

 
New York state parks
State parks
New York
New York
Parks